WKTE (1090 AM) is a radio station broadcasting a
variety format consisting of Oldies, Beach music, Classic Country, and Rhythm & Blues. Licensed to King, North Carolina, USA, it serves the Winston-Salem area.  The station is currently owned by Booth-Newsom Broadcasting. WKTE broadcasts during the daytime only; 1090 AM is a United States and Mexico clear-channel frequency.

External links

KTE
Radio stations established in 1963
1963 establishments in North Carolina
KTE